Marian Theodore Charlotte Heidenreich von Siebold (12 September 1788 – 8 July 1859) was a German physician. She is regarded as the first gynecologist in Germany. She was the daughter of the physicians Damian and Regina von Siebold and was an early assistant of her parents. She graduated with a degree in obstetrics at the Giessen University in 1817.

She assisted at both Queen Victoria's birth on 24 May 1819 at Kensington Palace in London and Queen Victoria's first cousin and husband Prince Albert of Saxe-Coburg-Gotha's birth on 26 August 1819 at Rosenau Palace near Coburg.

Notes

Sources 
 Ulrike Enke: Geburtshelferin der englischen Königin. In: Hessisches Ärzteblatt. 8, 2009, ISSN 0171-9661, S. 525–526, Volltext (PDF; 185 kB).

1788 births
1859 deaths
German gynaecologists
19th-century German people
German women physicians
University of Göttingen alumni
19th-century German physicians
19th-century women physicians